Sky Like a Broken Clock is an album by American blues singer and guitarist Kelly Joe Phelps, released in 2001. It reached #8 on the Billboard Top Blues Albums charts.

History
Sky Like A Broken Clock  was recorded live in the studio with no overdubs. It is Phelps' first record to feature no traditional material, only his own original compositions. Phelps' first releases were essentially his voice and the voice of his slide guitar. He assembled a band and put aside the slide guitar to focus on his fingerpicking style for this release.

Reception

Music critic Travis Draeset wrote in his Allmusic review "The result is a set of low-key, abstract story-songs about voodoo, sin, and prostitution, with "Worn Out," the album's closer, having a lullaby-like quality. Phelps' guitar work on this album is fairly straightforward (unfortunately not featuring his signature acoustic slide)." Minor 7th also noted the lack of Phelps' slide guitar and wrote: "The great news is that it's great music nonetheless, like discovering a brand-new artist... The abstractions that Phelps captures here are not those of musical notes, but of words forming oblique and cryptic, often dark, narratives."

Buzz McClain of No Depression noted the spontaneity of the recording, writing "The result is understandably raw and primitive, evocative and emotionally effective, made the more so by Phelps’ weary voice and his precise fingerpicking, which is every bit as impressive as his slide... This is a mature piece of art, made all the more poignant by the pick-up nature of an ensemble that, somehow, sounds strikingly seasoned."

PopMatters critic Fred Kovey is equivocal, writing: "Phelps does everything right, but it isn’t quite enough. His style of Blues and Celtic influenced singer-songwriting has become so identified with adult contemporary that just being good isn’t enough to pull the casual fan from his torpor... Phelps is an excellent guitar player. More than anything else, his skill with an acoustic six string is what makes him special. But to appreciate his guitar playing you’ll have to listen to the songs over and over; fans may want to, but I doubt the same is true of casual listeners... It offers the pleasure of viewing a master craftsman at work, but that pleasure isn’t quite enough."

Track listing
All songs written by Kelly Joe Phelps.
"Taylor John" – 5:43
"Clementine" – 6:10
"Sally Ruby" – 4:08
"Beggar's Oil" – 3:24
"Flash Cards" – 5:51
"Gold Tooth" – 6:49
"Tommy" – 5:28
"Fleashine" – 5:31
"Mr. My Go" – 6:52
"Worn Out" – 5:07

Personnel
Kelly Joe Phelps - vocals, guitar
Larry Taylor - bass
Billy Conway - drums, percussion
Tom West - Hammond organ
Dinty Child - pump organ, accordion
David Henry - cello
Jim Fitting - harmonica

Production
Produced by George Howard
Mixed by George Howard and David Henry
Mastered by Jeff Lipton

References

External links
George Graham Reviews website
Discography at Kelly Joe Phelps official web site.

2001 albums
Kelly Joe Phelps albums
Rykodisc albums
Albums recorded at Long View Farm